Candalides limbata is a species of butterfly of the family Lycaenidae. It was described by Gerald Edward Tite in 1963. It is found in West Irian (Snow Mountains and Fak Fak).

References

Candalidini
Butterflies described in 1963